Robert Keeble (born 17 March 1959) is  a former Australian rules footballer who played with St Kilda in the Victorian Football League (VFL).

Notes

External links 		
		
		

		
		
		
Living people		
1959 births		
		
Australian rules footballers from Victoria (Australia)		
St Kilda Football Club players